Jubilate may refer to:

 Psalm 100, from its Latin title
 Jubilate Group, British Christian music publishing house
 Jubilate Sunday